Igualita a mí is a 2010 Argentine comedy film directed by Diego Kaplan and starring Florencia Bertotti and Adrián Suar. The film was the highest-grossing Argentine film of 2010.

Plot 

Fredy, an unmarried 41-year-old man has no children and lives at night. He is the archetypal playboy, without a steady job and eternal seducer. One night, Fredy meets Aylin. Believing he will have a new affair, Aylin surprises him with the news that she is his daughter and he is going to be a grandfather. This changes his life when he least expected it.

Cast 
 Florencia Bertotti as Aylin
 Adrián Suar as Fredy
 Claudia Fontán as Elena
 Juan Carlos Galvan as Tony
 Gabriel Chame Buendia as Roque
 Ana Maria Castel as Dora
 Andrea Goldberg as Deborah
 Marco Gianoli as Young Fredy
 Florencia Miller as Marlana
 Noelia Marzol as Uma
 Laura Fernandez as Girl at the party

Box office 
It was the highest grossing film of 2010, surpassing 835 thousand viewers.

Awards and nominations

Adaptation 
An official Indian adaptation titled Jawaani Jaaneman was released in 2020 starring Saif Ali Khan, Tabu and Alaya F.

References

External links 
 
 

2010 films
2010s Spanish-language films
2010 comedy films
Films set in Buenos Aires
Films shot in Buenos Aires
Argentine comedy films
2010s pregnancy films
Argentine pregnancy films
Films distributed by Disney
2010s Argentine films